"Into the Valley" is a song by Scottish punk rock band Skids, released in 1979 as the second single from their debut album Scared to Dance. It is their best known song, appearing on a number of punk rock and Scottish music compilation albums. It reached number 10 on the UK Singles Chart for the week ending 24 March 1979. It was written by Richard Jobson and Stuart Adamson.

Background
The song's lyrics are notoriously unintelligible owing to Jobson's diction. This has been sent up in a television advertisement for Maxell audio cassettes which features printed (incorrect) "translations" of the words. The chorus, often misquoted, is actually "Ahoy! Ahoy! Land, sea and sky".

Jobson has said that the lyrics were written about the recruitment of Scottish youths into the army and more specifically about a friend who had been killed whilst on a tour of duty in Northern Ireland.

Local legend still persists that the valley mentioned is a reference to  High Valleyfield, known locally as "the Valley", a village with a reputation for "mini warfare" between its residents and those of nearby towns and villages (namely Torryburn, Rosyth, Oakley and Inverkeithing), near Skids' home town of Dunfermline.

Inspiration may also be the 1971 film The Last Valley, starring Michael Caine and with a theme scored by John Barry.

Usage in football/media

"Into the Valley" is still used as a theme song for fans of Scottish football team Dunfermline Athletic F.C., the local team of the band, and also Charlton Athletic F.C. of the English Football League Championship whose stadium is named The Valley. It was also used in their premiership years by Bradford City A.F.C., whose stadium is named Valley Parade. It is also played as the teams come out at the Valley Stadium, home of Redditch United F.C.

In 2012, the song was used in a television advertising campaign by the cycle and motoring accessory retailer Halfords.

References

1979 songs
1979 singles
Skids (band) songs
Virgin Records singles
Songs written by Stuart Adamson
Songs written by Richard Jobson (television presenter)